Merlin is a surname. Notable people with the surname include:

Albert Merlin (1931–2015), French economist and vice-president of the "Presaje" institute
Alessandra Merlin (born 1975), retired Italian alpine skier
Alfred Merlin (1876–1965), French historian and archaeologist
André Merlin (1911–1960), French tennis player
Antoine Christophe Merlin (1762–1833), also known as Merlin de Thionville, French politician
Antoine François Eugène Merlin (1778–1854), French soldier and general 
Arnaud Merlin (born 1963), French jazz critic, music journalist and radio producer
Christian Merlin (born 1964), French contemporary music critic and musicologist
Christine Merlin,  French chronobiologist and an associate professor of biology 
Christophe Antoine Merlin (1771–1839), French cavalry general in the Napoleonic Wars
Dino Merlin (born 1962), Bosnian musician
Émile Merlin (1875–1938), Belgian mathematician and astronomer
Ernest Merlin (1886–1959), British cyclist
Gerald Merlin (1884–1945), British sports shooter
Henry Beaufoy Merlin (1830–1873), Australian photographer, showman, illusionist and illustrator
Jacques Merlin (1480–1541), French theologian and book editor
Jan Merlin (1925–2019), American character actor, television writer, and author
Jean-Claude Merlin (born 1954), French astronomer
Joanna Merlin (born 1931), American actress and casting director
John Joseph Merlin (1735–1803), Belgian inventor and horologist
Kristen Merlin (born 1984), American country singer
Laurent Merlin (born 1984), French footballer
Lina Merlin (1887–1979), Italian politician
Martial Henri Merlin (1860–1935), French colonial administrator 
Philippe-Antoine Merlin de Douai (1754–1838) French politician and lawyer
Quentin Merlin (born 2002), French footballer
Renzo Merlin (1923–2003), Italian professional football player
Roberto Merlin, Argentine physicist
Serge Merlin (1933–2019), French actor
Shmuel Merlin (1910–1994), Zionist activist, Irgun member and Israeli politician
Sidney Merlin (1856–1952), Greek botanist and sports shooter
Umberto Merlin (1885–1964), Italian lawyer and politician